Melanomma is a genus of fungi in the family Melanommataceae.  It probably evolved from a lichen ancestor, as it is closely related to many lichenized species of fungi.

Species
 Melanomma acanthophilum 
 Melanomma afflatum 
 Melanomma anceps 
 Melanomma andinum 
 Melanomma artemisiae-maritimae 
 Melanomma aspegrenii 
 Melanomma aurantiicola 
 Melanomma aurantiiphila 
 Melanomma australiense 
 Melanomma brachythele 
 Melanomma bubakii 
 Melanomma cacheutense 
 Melanomma caesalpiniae 
 Melanomma caryophagum 
 Melanomma castillejae 
 Melanomma ceratoniae 
 Melanomma chilense 
 Melanomma citricola 
 Melanomma conjunctum 
 Melanomma corticis 
 Melanomma cryptostegiae 
 Melanomma cucurbitarioideum 
 Melanomma dactylosporum 
 Melanomma dinghuense 
 Melanomma distinctum 
 Melanomma drimydis 
 Melanomma dryinum 
 Melanomma dzungaricum 
 Melanomma ebeni 
 Melanomma epiphytica 
 Melanomma gigantica 
 Melanomma glumarum 
 Melanomma gregarium 
 Melanomma halimodendri 
 Melanomma haloxyli 
 Melanomma helianthemi 
 Melanomma heraclei 
 Melanomma herpotrichum 
 Melanomma japonicum 
 Melanomma jenynsii 
 Melanomma juniperi 
 Melanomma langloisii 
 Melanomma lithophilae 
 Melanomma longicolle 
 Melanomma marathawadense 
 Melanomma margaretae 
 Melanomma martinianum 
 Melanomma mate 
 Melanomma medium 
 Melanomma mindorense 
 Melanomma mojunkumica 
 Melanomma moravicum 
 Melanomma mutabile 
 Melanomma myricae 
 Melanomma nigriseda 
 Melanomma obliterans 
 Melanomma obtusissimum 
 Melanomma oryzae 
 Melanomma oxysporum 
 Melanomma panici-miliacei 
 Melanomma philippinense 
 Melanomma populicola 
 Melanomma praeandinum 
 Melanomma pulveracea 
 Melanomma pulvis-pyrius 
 Melanomma pyriostictum 
 Melanomma rhododendri 
 Melanomma ribis 
 Melanomma rubicundum 
 Melanomma sanguinarium 
 Melanomma saviczii 
 Melanomma scrophulariae 
 Melanomma sordidissimum 
 Melanomma sparsum 
 Melanomma spiniferum 
 Melanomma subandinum 
 Melanomma subdispersum 
 Melanomma submojunkumica 
 Melanomma thespesiae 
 Melanomma trevoae 
 Melanomma vile 
 Melanomma xylariae

References

Melanommataceae
Lichen genera
Taxa named by Karl Wilhelm Gottlieb Leopold Fuckel
Taxa described in 1870